Ciubotaru may refer to:

Ciubotaru (surname), Romanian surname
Ciubotaru River, a tributary of the river Siret in Romania
Haloșul Ciubotaru River, a tributary of the Caşin in Romania